Naroi is a village located on Moala Island, in the Eastern District and Lau Province of Fiji. It has a population of 550, making it the largest village in the island.

Population 
 1921: 240
 1936: 194 (and 60 in the newly founded neighboring Namoala)
 1946: 245 (49)
 1955: 340 (Namoala had fallen desolate, the inhabitants returned to Naroi)

Further reading
 Marshall Sahlins: Moala. Culture and Nature on a Fijian Island. University of Michigan Press, Ann Arbor 1962.

References 

Populated places in Fiji